State Highway 10 (SH 10) is a  state highway in the US state of Colorado. SH 10's western terminus is at Interstate 25 (I-25) and U.S. Route 160 (US 160) in Walsenburg, and the eastern terminus is at US 50 in La Junta.

History 
The route was established in the 1920s, when it began at the Utah state line near Dove Creek and went east to Walsenburg on today's Interstate 25. By 1936, a section was added pushing SH 10's terminus east to La Junta. By 1938, the route was corrected in a more straight line and most of the route was paved. The entire route was paved by 1960. The entire section from the Utah border to Walsenburg, the original alignment of the route, was relinquished in 1968.

Major intersections

References

External links

Transportation in Huerfano County, Colorado
Transportation in Las Animas County, Colorado
Transportation in Pueblo County, Colorado
Transportation in Otero County, Colorado
010